"Dancing in September" is an alternate name for "September", a single by Earth, Wind & Fire.

Dancing in September is a 2000 HBO television film starring Isaiah Washington and Nicole Ari Parker.

Plot
Dancing In September tells the story of two hopeful and ambitious African-Americans attempting to make their mark in the television industry. One is a scriptwriter named Tomasina “Tommy” Crawford (Parker), who has grown weary of contributing to stereotypical characters and programming for African-Americans and dreams of creating a balanced, positive program for herself and the African-American public. The other is a newly appointed television producer named George Washington (Washington), who hopes to ascend to the highest levels of the television industry and carve out a special place for himself to help redefine African-American programming. When Tommy submits a script for a positive family sitcom titled "Just Us," she is indirectly brought into George's path. The rest of the film follows the struggles that both she and George face in their specific environments, mainly painting a positive portrayal of African-Americans in the media, in addition to staying true to their own culture and identity as African-Americans.

Cast
 Nicole Ari Parker as Tomasina "Tommy" Crawford
 Isaiah Washington as George Washington
 Vicellous Reon Shannon as James
 Jay Underwood as Michael Daniels
 Marcia Cross as Lydia Gleason
 Jenifer Lewis as Judge Warner
 James Avery as Mr. Warner
 Michael Cavanaugh as Harbor
 Malinda Williams as Rhonda

Awards and nominations
Black Reel Awards
2002: Won, "Best Director on Network/Cable" - Reggie Rock Bythewood
2002: Won, "Best Screenplay (Original or Adapted) on Network/Cable" - Reggie Rock Bythewood
2002: Nominated, "Best Actress on Network/Cable" - Nicole Ari Parker
2002: Nominated, "Best Film on Network/Cable"
2002: Nominated, "Best Supporting Actor in Network/Cable" - Vicellous Reon Shannon

Emmy Award
2001: Nominated, "Outstanding Music and Lyrics" - Mark Sparks & Sy Smith

Humanitas Prize
2001: Nominated, "Sundance Film Category" - Reggie Rock Bythewood

NAACP Image Awards
2002: Nominated, "Outstanding Actor in a Television Movie, Mini-Series or Dramatic Special" - Isaiah Washington
2002: Nominated, "Outstanding Television Movie, Mini-Series or Dramatic Special"

External links

 

HBO Films films
2000 drama films
2000 television films
2000 films
2000s English-language films